Aspergillus avenaceus is a species of fungus in the genus Aspergillus. It is from the Flavi section. The species was first described in 1943. A. avenaceus has been isolated in the UK from a Pisum sativum seed, and in the United States. It has been reported to produce avenaciolide and aspirochlorine.

Growth and morphology

A. avenaceus has been cultivated on both Czapek yeast extract agar (CYA) plates and Malt Extract Agar Oxoid® (MEAOX) plates. The growth morphology of the colonies can be seen in the pictures below.

References 

avenaceus
Fungi described in 1943